The Massachusetts Correctional Institution—Cedar Junction (MCI-Cedar Junction), formerly known as MCI-Walpole, is a maximum security prison under the jurisdiction of the Massachusetts Department of Correction. It was opened in 1956 to replace Charlestown State Prison, the oldest prison in the nation at that time. MCI-Cedar Junction is one of two (the other one being Souza-Baranowski Correctional Center) maximum security prisons for male offenders in the Commonwealth of Massachusetts. As of January 6, 2020 there was 346 Maximum and 65 Medium inmates in general population beds.

MCI-Cedar Junction also houses the Departmental Disciplinary Unit (DDU). During the 1970s, Cedar Junction (then known as Walpole) was one of the most violent prisons in the United States. It is located on both sides of the line between the towns of Walpole and Norfolk, and has a South Walpole mailing address (South Walpole is not a political entity).

In 1955, Richard Cardinal Cushing, Archbishop of Boston, built Our Lady of the Ransom Chapel at the center of the prison. As of June 2009, MCI-Cedar Junction serves as the reception and diagnostic center, which receives all new male court commitments for the Commonwealth of Massachusetts' Department of Correction.

Uprising 

In 1973, after the Attica Prison riot, a branch of the National Prisoner Reform Association (NPRA) was established. The NPRA, which became the prisoners' legitimate representative, organized committees which ran the prison for three months, monitored by neutral civilian observers and other volunteers from local communities. During that time the murder rate in Walpole fell from the highest in the country to zero. The strike ended in the prisoners' favor as the superintendent of the prison resigned. The prisoners were granted more visitation rights and work programs.

Notable inmates

Tony Costa - Serial killer believed to have brutally murdered and dismembered four women (possibly more than nine). He died by suicide by hanging in his cell on May 12, 1974.
Wayne Lo - School shooter who perpetrated the shooting at Bard College at Simon's Rock.
Albert DeSalvo - Serial rapist widely believed to be the Boston Strangler. He was stabbed to death by an inmate in 1973.
John Salvi - Abortion opponent who killed two and wounded five at abortion clinics in Brookline, Massachusetts. He died by suicide by asphyxiation on November 29, 1996.

In popular culture 
In Ray Donovan TV series, the main character’s menacing father Mickey Donovan (Jon Voight) spent 20 years in 'Walpole' prison, before he was released in 2013.

Closure 
As of April 2022, Cedar Junction is planned to be shut down within the next two years due to reduced incarceration rates (currently the lowest in 35 years) and the high costs of maintenance. The Massachusetts Department of Correction (DOC) estimates the cost to repair the infrastructure of Cedar Junction at 30 million dollars; the DOC plans to move the money towards delivering effective care and services for the people under their supervision. The process of closing the prison is split into three main phases. First phase plans to start around the summer of 2022, moving any newly sentenced men to the Souza-Baranowski Correctional Center, a maximum security prison located in Lancaster, Massachusetts. In the second phase, prisoners in the Behavioral Management unit will be moved to other facilities. Lastly, in the third phase, the Department Disciplinary Unit is set to be dissolved around 2024. The removal of the Disciplinary Unit is an attempt by the DOC to reform their approaches to discipline.

References

External links
 MCI-Cedar Junction website

1955 establishments in Massachusetts
Buildings and structures in Norfolk County, Massachusetts
Cedar Junction
Supermax prisons
Walpole, Massachusetts